The Hitachi Sirio (Italian for Sirius, formerly sold as the AnsaldoBreda Sirio) is a low-floor tram built by Hitachi Rail Italy (formerly AnsaldoBreda), a Japanese-Italian manufacturer of trains, trams and light-rail vehicles. It can be ordered as either one-directional or bi-directional and with a variety of track gauges.

Operators

Italy

Milan

Azienda Trasporti Milanesi (ATM), the city transport company of Milan, has bought 93 Sirios (all one direction cars). In 2002, the first carriages were delivered. Part of the 7500 will be numbered in the 7600 series because of minor modifications. It is not exactly known how many Sirio will be built.

All Sirios in Milan sport a dark green livery; the Siriettos sport either the dark green livery or a white-and-yellow livery.

Bergamo 
There are 14 bi-directional trams used on the Bergamo–Albino light rail.

Florence 
There were delivered 46 (17+22+7) bi-directional trams.

Naples  
There were delivered 22 bi-directional (driver seats in both ends) trams.

Sassari  
4 st bi-directional for Metrosassari.  track gauge.

Sweden

Gothenburg

The city of Gothenburg, Sweden, ordered 40 one-directional Sirio trams which were to be put into service on the Gothenburg tram network during 2005 and onwards. The trams were delivered late and functioned poorly when put into traffic. Among reported problems were excessive track damage caused by the trams, malfunctioning air conditioners inside the trams, and poor ride quality. The City of Gothenburg therefore withheld a large part of the payment for a delivered tram until fully operational.

On December 3, 2009, the city authorities exercised their option for a further 25 trams of the same design at a cost of €61 million.

In February 2013, 38 out of the total 40 trams delivered in the first series were taken out of service due to extensive corrosion on the chassis. Repairing the rusted chassis and moldy passenger floors is expected to be completed by 2017, at a cost of an extra €10 million for the Gothenburg council, according to the revised contract, though Ansaldobreda bears the majority of the cost for these deficiencies. .

Due to further delays on the part of Ansaldobreda with corrosion repairs and substandard quality in completed works, the council of Gothenburg cancelled the contract for corrosion repairs in November 2015. The investigation launched into the matter found, that the trams were jerry-built, . It was also discovered, that the badly built trams have resulted in extensive track damage that will be very costly to repair, adding to the "fiasco" of the Gothenburg Ansaldobreda tram affair.

In August 2017, an arbitration outside the courts awarded Gothenburg municipality 12 million euro in damages. The municipality was to compensate Ansaldobreda for a breach of contract as the municipality had annulled the contract on the grounds of late delivery of often faulty trams, while Ansaldobreda was to compensate the municipality for their extra expenses and the inability of the trams deliver the promised logistic capacity.

Greece

Athens 

Athens Tram operates a fleet of 35 bi-directional Sirio vehicles, styled by Pininfarina.

Turkey

Samsun 

The Samsun Tram uses 16 trams.

Kayseri 
38 tramvay kullanılmakta

China

Zhuhai 
Zhuhai Tram Line 1, opening November 2014, trams built by CRRC Dalian.

Beijing 

Xijiao line, trams built by CRRC Dalian.

Notes

External links 
 Ansaldobreda Sirio official page
 Ansaldobreda Sirio type 7100 pictures
 Ansaldobreda Sirio type 7500 pictures
 Florence tramway project official site

Tram vehicles of Greece
Tram vehicles of Italy
Tram vehicles of Sweden
Articulated passenger trains
AnsaldoBreda trams
600 V DC multiple units